Megalebia is a genus of beetles in the family Carabidae, containing the following species:

 Megalebia colasi Mateu, 1972
 Megalebia migrotestacea Mateu, 1972

References

Lebiinae